The Bangladesh Premier League (BPL), officially known as TVS Bangladesh Premier League for sponsorship reasons, is a top tier of Bangladeshi professional football league pyramid. It is run directly by the professional football league committee of Bangladesh Football Federation (BFF). Dhaka Derby is one of the most popular matches in the league. The league is the successor of Dhaka Premier Division League, which existed from 1948 to 2006.

History
Founded in 2007, the league was previously known as the B League. The league was renamed to Bangladesh League in 2009 Then in 2012, it was renamed to Bangladesh Premier League (BPL). The start of BPL marked the start of professional league and a wide open national league.

The first B League match took place on 2 March 2007 between Abahani Limited Dhaka and Muktijoddha Sangsad KC. The match, which took place at the Bangabandhu National Stadium in Dhaka, ended in a goalless draw. The next day in Khulna, Prashanta Dey scored the first goal in the history of professional football in the country as Khulna Abahani blanked the capital side Rahmatganj MFS 2–0. On 27 March 2007, Alfaz Ahmed netted the first hat-trick in B.League history to give Muktijoddha SKC a 4–1 win over Rahmatganj MFS.

Abahani Limited Dhaka have won the league a record six times since 2007. During 2015–16 Bangladesh Football Premier League, Abahani Limited Dhaka also became the first team to win the professional league title with an unbeaten record.

Competition format

Competition
From the 2022–23 season, there are 11 clubs in the Bangladesh Premier League, instead of the previous 12. During the course of a season (usually from December to July) each club plays the other clubs twice (a double round-robin system), once at their home stadium and once at that of their opponents, for 20 games. Teams receive three points for a win and one point for a draw. No points are awarded for a loss. Teams are ranked by position on the league table depending on points, then the head-to-head record between the tied teams is taken into consideration, and then goal difference.

Promotion and relegation
A system of promotion and relegation exists between the Bangladesh Premier League and the Bangladesh Championship League. The two lowest placed teams in the Bangladesh Premier League are relegated to the First Division, and the top two teams from the First Division are promoted to the Bangladesh Premier League.

Champions

Successful clubs by seasons

Performance by clubs

Clubs

Current clubs (2022–23)

Former clubs
The following clubs are not competing in the Bangladesh Football Premier League during the 2021–22 season but competed in the Premier League for at least one season.

All-time BPL table
The all-time BPL table is an overall record of all match results, points, and goals of every team that has played in BPL since its inception in 2007. The table is accurate as of the end of the 2021–22 season. Teams in bold are part of the 2022–23 season. Numbers in bold are the record (highest either positive or negative) numbers in each column.

League or status at 2022–23 season:

Head coaches
In terms of coaching performance, after the first 11 seasons of the BPL, a Bangladeshi head coach has won the BPL six times while a foreign head coach has won it five times. Pakir Ali of Sri Lanka was the first foreign head coach to win the BPL while the second coach was Ali Akbar Pourmoslemi of Iran. Spaniard Óscar Bruzón was the most recent foreign coach to win the BPL in the 2018–19 season.

Amalesh Sen was the first Bangladeshi coach to win the BPL in the league's opening season and he has the most BPL championships at three. Maruful Haque and Atiqur Rahman Atiq the only other Bangladeshi coach to win the Bangladesh Premier League.

The current head coaches in the Bangladesh Premier League are:

Stats and players

Seasonal statistics

Top scorers

Season after season, players in the BPL compete for the golden boot title, which is awarded at the end of each season to the top scorer throughout the entire season. The most recent winner of the golden boot is Souleymane Diabate, who won the golden boot at the end of the 2021–22 season after scoring 21 goals. Raphael Odovin Onwrebe is both currently the holders of the most golden boot titles with two golden boots. The five Nigerians make up the six golden boots won by Nigerians, the most of any nationality in the league. While to date Enamul Haque remains the only local golden boot winner, claiming the award in 2009–10.

Bangladeshi top scorers

Records

All-time top scorers

Appearances 

Italics denotes players still playing professional football,Bold denotes players still playing in the Bangladesh Premier League.

Awards

Player of the Season

Young Player of the Season

Sponsorship

Media coverage 
132 matches of season 2015–2016 were broadcast live at BTV World and Boishakhi TV, also live commentary was produced by Radio Next FM.  Every match of this league has been streaming live on BFF's page of Mycujoo platform from 2018 to 2019 season. Bangla TV started broadcasting selected matches of the BPL 2018–19 matches live from 9 May 2019. The first sports channel of Bangladesh T sports started to broadcast the matches of BPL 2020–21 from 13 January 2021.

Stadiums

BPL clubs in Asia

Continental qualification 

Bangladesh Premier League teams can qualify for the top Asian club competitions – the AFC Champions League qualifying play-offs and AFC Cup – through their performance in the league. Before the 2012–13 season Bangladeshi clubs were only allowed entry to the now defunct AFC President's Cup, which was a competition targeted for emerging football nations. Since the 2021–22 season the league winners are allowed entry to the qualifying play-offs of the AFC Champions League.

Abahani Limited Dhaka was the first Bangladesh Premier League club to club to play in Asian competition when they participated in the 2008 AFC President's Cup. The club qualified for the competition, after winning the first edition of the league in 2007. The first six seasons of the league Bangladeshi clubs only participated in the AFC President's Cup, until Sheikh Russel KC the winners of the 2012–13 league season were given entry 2015 AFC Cup qualifying play-off. The winners of the 2013–14 season of the league Sheikh Jamal Dhanmondi Club, were the first Bangladeshi club to be given direct entry into the AFC Cup, during the 2016 AFC Cup.

In July 2022, it was confirmed that Bashundhara Kings, the winners of the 2021–22 league season will partake in the AFC Champions League Play-off round, while holding an automatic place in the AFC Cup group stages if they are unable to advance past the play-offs. Meanwhile the runner-up of the league will take part in the qualifiers of the AFC Cup or will directly qualify for the competition if the league winners advance past the AFC Champions League play-offs. The league's third place team along with the Federation Cup champions, will remain standby for the AFC Cup Play-off round if the league winners succeed to qualify for the AFC Champions League main stage.

Updated on 5 October 2022.
(Source)

BPL clubs in AFC tournament

Defunct
Competitions previously run by AFC include:

See also
 Bangladesh Football Federation
 Bangladesh Women's Football League 
 Federation Cup
 Independence Cup
 Super Cup
 Bangladesh Championship League
 BFF U-18 Football League
 BFF U-16 Football Tournament
 Dhaka Derby
 List of Bangladeshi football champions
 Bangladesh national football team

References

External links
 Bangladesh Premier League at FIFA.com
 Bangladesh Premier League at soccerway.com

 
1
Bangladesh
Sports leagues established in 2007
2007 establishments in Bangladesh
Professional sports leagues in Bangladesh